José Antonio García Rabasco (born 29 September 1986), known as Verza, is a Spanish former professional footballer who played as a central midfielder.

Club career

Born in Orihuela, Alicante, Verza finished his youth career in Villarreal CF's academy, going on to spend two years with the reserves in the lower leagues. On 22 June 2003, he made his first-team – and La Liga – debut, playing the last 20 minutes in a 1–4 home loss against Real Betis.

In January 2005, Verza was loaned to Segunda División side Recreativo de Huelva until the end of the season. In July, he joined neighbouring Córdoba CF in the Segunda División B.

In January 2007, after being sparingly used by the Andalusians, Verza moved to Orihuela CF on loan, signing permanently in July. After a one and a half years with the Valencian club, he joined second-tier Albacete Balompié on a two-year deal.

Verza was an undisputed starter for the Castile-La Mancha side the following years but, after their relegation in 2011, he terminated his contract and signed with UD Almería from the same league shortly after.

Verza appeared in 40 league matches in his second season (plus four in the play-offs), helping the Rojiblancos return to the top flight after a two-year absence. He played his first game in the competition in more than one decade on 19 August 2013, starting in a 2–3 home loss to former side Villarreal, and scored his first goal late in the month by netting from the penalty spot in the 2–2 home draw with Elche CF.

On 8 February 2014, Verza grabbed a brace at the Estadio de los Juegos Mediterráneos to help hand Atlético Madrid the second consecutive loss of the campaign, scoring the final 2–0 through a penalty. On 7 January of the following year, he scored an own goal and a penalty in the 1–1 home draw against Getafe CF in the round of 16 of the Copa del Rey.

On 8 June 2015, Verza signed a four-year deal with Levante UD after his contract expired. On 31 August 2017, he returned to Almería after agreeing to a one-year loan.

Verza became a free agent on 29 August 2018, and joined second division team CF Rayo Majadahonda two days later. The following 19 July, after suffering relegation, he signed a two-year contract with third-tier FC Cartagena.

Verza helped Efesé in their promotion to division two in his first season, but terminated his contract on 11 January 2021 after being rarely used in his second.

Career statistics

Club

Honours
Villarreal
UEFA Intertoto Cup: 2003

Levante
Segunda División: 2016–17

References

External links

1986 births
Living people
People from Orihuela
Sportspeople from the Province of Alicante
Spanish footballers
Footballers from the Valencian Community
Association football midfielders
La Liga players
Segunda División players
Segunda División B players
Divisiones Regionales de Fútbol players
Villarreal CF B players
Villarreal CF players
Recreativo de Huelva players
Córdoba CF players
Orihuela CF players
Albacete Balompié players
UD Almería players
Levante UD footballers
CF Rayo Majadahonda players
FC Cartagena footballers
Real Murcia players
Spain youth international footballers